William Calvin Chesnut (June 27, 1873 – October 16, 1962) was a United States district judge of the United States District Court for the District of Maryland.

Education and career

Born in Baltimore, Maryland, Chesnut received an Artium Baccalaureus degree from Johns Hopkins University in 1892 and a Bachelor of Laws from the University of Maryland School of Law in 1894. He was an assistant state's attorney of Baltimore from 1896 to 1899. He was in private practice in Baltimore from 1899 to 1931. He was a lecturer for the University of Maryland School of Law from 1911 to 1931.

Federal judicial service

Chesnut received a recess appointment from President Herbert Hoover on May 9, 1931, to a seat on the United States District Court for the District of Maryland vacated by Judge Morris Ames Soper. He was nominated to the same position by President Hoover on December 15, 1931. He was confirmed by the United States Senate on January 12, 1932, and received his commission the same day. He assumed senior status on July 31, 1953. His service terminated on October 16, 1962, due to his death in Baltimore.

See also 

 List of federal judges appointed by Herbert Hoover

References

1873 births
1962 deaths
Judges of the United States District Court for the District of Maryland
United States district court judges appointed by Herbert Hoover
20th-century American judges
Lawyers from Baltimore
Johns Hopkins University alumni
University of Maryland Francis King Carey School of Law alumni
University of Maryland, Baltimore faculty